Syed Nasir Hussain Shah is a Pakistani politician who currently holds the office of Provincial Minister at the Government of Sindh for Local Government, Forests and Religious Affairs. He had previously been Sindh's Provincial Minister for Works and Services from 5 September 2018 to August 2019. He was also a Member of the Provincial Assembly of Sindh from May 2013 to May 2018.

Early life and education
He was born on 10 November 1961.

He received a degree of Master of Arts in political science from Shah Abdul Latif University.

Political career

He was elected to the Provincial Assembly of Sindh as a candidate of Pakistan Peoples Party (PPP) from Constituency PS-2 (Sukkur-II) in 2013 Pakistani general election.

In May 2018, a petition was filed against him in the Sindh High Court to disqualify him from holding any public office and to bar him from contesting the 2018 Pakistani general election on the grounds that he holds work permit of the UAE.

He was re-elected to Provincial Assembly of Sindh as a candidate of PPP from Constituency PS-25 (Sukkur-IV) in 2018 general election.

On 5 September 2018, he was inducted into the provincial Sindh cabinet of Chief Minister Syed Murad Ali Shah and was appointed as Provincial Minister of Sindh for works and services.

On 5 August 2019, he was appointed Provincial Minister of Sindh for Local Government, Forests and Religious Affairs.

References

Living people
Sindh MPAs 2013–2018
Pakistan People's Party MPAs (Sindh)
Sindh MPAs 2018–2023
1964 births